The 1918 Minnesota gubernatorial election took place on November 5, 1918. The incumbent Republican Party of Minnesota governor J. A. A. Burnquist defeated Farmer–Labor Party challenger David H. Evans.  This is the first gubernatorial election in Minnesota with a Farmer–Labor candidate. Charles August Lindbergh unsuccessfully ran for the Republican nomination.

Results

See also
 List of Minnesota gubernatorial elections

External links
 http://www.sos.state.mn.us/home/index.asp?page=653
 http://www.sos.state.mn.us/home/index.asp?page=657

Minnesota
Gubernatorial
1918
November 1918 events